Elslack is a village and civil parish in the Craven district of North Yorkshire, England, close to the border with Lancashire and 4 miles west of Skipton. Thornton in Craven is nearby. The Tempest Arms is a large pub in the village, sited by the A56, which is popular with locals from the surrounding area. Elslack Moor, above the village, is crossed by the Pennine Way, though this does not visit the village itself.

History
The fort may have been named Olenacum, or Ριγοδουνον, according to the analysis of Ptolemy's coordinates by Kleineberg et al. It guarded a Roman road linking two other forts: Bremetennacum at Ribchester and another at Ilkley. Then at  it turns eastwards passing Barnoldswick, Elslack and Skipton.

Elslack is mentioned in the 1086 Domesday Book as Eleslac.

Elslack had its own railway station, but this was closed in 1952. The line passing through it suffered the same fate in 1970. The station site is now privately owned.

The Tempest Arms was named "Pub of the Year" in the 2011 Good Pub Guide.

References

External links

Villages in North Yorkshire
Civil parishes in North Yorkshire